Samuel Palmer (died 1732) was an English printer and author.

Life
He operated in a house in Bartholomew Close, London, later occupied by the two Jameses the typefounders. In 1725 Benjamin Franklin found work there, staying for a year, and was employed on the second edition of William Wollaston's Religion of Nature; during this period Franklin wrote A Dissertation on Liberty and Necessity, Pleasure and Pain.

On 15 February 1731 a printing-press was set up at St. James's House for the Duke of York and some of the princesses to work under Palmer's supervision. Although his business was large and successful, Palmer ultimately became bankrupt. He was ailing two years before his death, which took place on 9 May 1732.

Works
In March 1729 Palmer circulated a prospectus of ‘The Practical Part of Printing, in which the Materials are fully described and all the Manual Operations explained’. But those in the trade were concerned that secrets would be disclosed, and the Earls of Pembroke and Oxford, Richard Mead, and others, persuaded him to change his plan, and write a history of printing. Several parts were actually published – about two-thirds of the book – when Palmer died.
 
Palmer's ‘History of Printing’ was completed after his death by George Psalmanazar, who in his Memoirs claimed to have written the whole book. It appeared as The General History of Printing, from its first invention in the City of Mentz to its first progress and propagation thro' the most celebrated cities in Europe, particularly its introduction, rise, and progress here in England, London, 1732. A ‘remainder’ edition was issued by A. Bettesworth and other booksellers with a new title in black and red, A General History of Printing from the first Invention of it in the City of Mentz, &c., 1733. Joseph Ames's copy of the History, with manuscript notes, was purchased by James Bindley in 1786. The second part, containing the practical part, ready for printing, was also in the possession of Ames, the author of a more successful history of English printing; it was, however, entirely derivative, being a translation of a French work by Martin-Dominique Fertel.

References

Notes

Attribution

Year of birth missing
1732 deaths
English printers